Yahya ibn Sarafyun (9th century) a Syriac physician, known in Europe as Johannes Serapion, and commonly called Serapion the Elder to distinguish him from Serapion the Younger, with whom he was often confused.

Biography
Nothing is known of the events of his life, except that he was a Christian physician, and lived in the second half of the 9th century.

Two works are extant that bear his name; one called Aphorismi Magni Momenti de Medicina Practica; the other, entitled al-Kunnash, which has been published under the various names, Pandectae, Aggregator, Breviarium, Practica, and Therapeutica Methodus. The object of the work is to collect and put together in an abridged form the opinions of the Greek and Arabic physicians concerning diseases and their treatment. He also transcribes out of Alexander of Tralles, an author with whom few other Arabic writers seem to have been much acquainted.

References
The Penny Cyclopaedia of the Society for the Diffusion of Useful Knowledge (1841), pages 259–260

Syrian Christians
9th-century Christians
Physicians of the medieval Islamic world
9th-century physicians